Æternam Films is a French film production company based in Paris, France. It was founded in 2002 by Francesca Feder. Arnaud Louvet joined in 2007.

Feature films

Television

References

IMDB : Æternam Films
Aeternam Films

Film production companies of France
Companies based in Paris
Mass media companies established in 2002
French companies established in 2002
Mass media in Paris